= Riya Williams Yuyada =

South Sudanese women's rights activist, peacebuilder, and feminist advocate

- Born: Riya Williams Yuyada; South Sudan
- Citizenship: South Sudan
- Occupations: Activist, Peacebuilder, Feminist advocate
- Organization: Crown The Woman South Sudan
- Known for: Women's rights advocacy, peacebuilding initiatives
- Notable work: Founder of Crown The Woman South Sudan
- Movement: Feminism, Human rights activism
- Awards: Ginetta Sagan Award (2021)

Riya Williams Yuyada (born 1991) is a South Sudanese women’s rights activist, peace builder, and feminist advocate. She is known for her work in promoting gender equality, peace building, and community healing in South Sudan.

== Early life and background ==
Riya Williams Yuyada was born in South Sudan in 1991 and experienced the effects of conflict and displacement during her early life. These experiences fueled her commitment to peace building and advocacy for women’s rights. Growing up in a conflict affected environment fueled her interest in addressing gender-based violence and promoting social justice.

== Career and activism ==
She is the founder of Crown The Woman South Sudan, an initiative focused on empowering women and girls through leadership development, advocacy, and community engagement. She has also been involved in peace building initiatives aimed at fostering dialogue and reconciliation in conflict-affected communities.

Her work includes advocating against gender-based violence and promoting women’s participation in peace processes. She has collaborated with various organizations to support women’s leadership and amplify the voices of underrepresented communities in South Sudan.

== Recognition and awards ==
Yuyada received the Ginetta Sagan Award from Amnesty International in 2021 l in recognition of her work in advancing women’s rights and peace building efforts in South Sudan. Her recognition has been highlighted by international media, including Voice of America, which wrote on her contributions to women’s rights advocacy.

== Advocacy and impact ==
Yuyada’s advocacy focuses on feminism, peace building, and healing from trauma caused by conflict. She has worked to create safe spaces for women and girls and encourages community-based approaches to conflict resolution. Girls' Globe. She has also contributed to discussions on African feminism and the role of women in leadership and development across the continent.
